I Concentrate on You: A Tribute to Cole Porter is an album by American jazz saxophonist Lee Konitz and bassist Red Mitchell recorded in Denmark in 1974 and released on the Danish SteepleChase label.

Critical reception

Ken Dryden on Allmusic said "With an inventive accompanist like Mitchell spurring him on, the alto saxophonist is able to work magical variations of the familiar Porter works, while Konitz retains his remarkable dry signature tone".

Track listing 
All compositions by Cole Porter.
 "Just One of Those Things" – 5:08  
 "Just One of Those Things" (Take 7) – 3:04 Bonus track on CD reissue
 "Easy to Love" – 3:13  
 "It's All Right with Me" – 2:59  
 "Ev'ry Time We Say Goodbye" (Take 1) – 2:47 Bonus track on CD reissue  
 "Ev'rytime We Say Goodbye" – 2:49  
 "You'd Be So Nice to Come Home To" – 3:45  
 "Love for Sale" – 5:15  
 "In the Still of the Night" – 2:10  
 "Night and Day" (Take 1) – 5:12 Bonus track on CD reissue  
 "Night and Day" – 3:54  
 "I Love You" – 3:34  
 "I Love Paris" – 3:22  
 "I Concentrate on You" – 9:13

Personnel 
Lee Konitz – alto saxophone
Red Mitchell – bass, piano

References 

Lee Konitz albums
Red Mitchell albums
1974 albums
SteepleChase Records albums
Cole Porter tribute albums